Alter Natives were an instrumental band in Richmond, Virginia in the mid 1980s and early 1990s. Formed by Greg Ottinger, Jim Thomson, Chris Bopst, and Eric Ungar in 1984, their work has been described as a combination of "metal/tropical/surf" and as having "connections to progressive and space rock, albeit an unusually concise, powerful, and disciplined version of those genres", and "hard and fast instrumental fare geared tunefully by a mean, acidic guitar interplay and essential upfront rhythms". The band signed to SST Records in 1986 and released three albums through the label. Though only four albums were released, material from a fifth unreleased album is available in rough form on the band's MySpace page.

Members 
 Chris Bopst – bass guitar
 Greg Ottinger – guitar
 Jim Thomson – drums
 Eric Ungar – saxophone and flute (1985–1988)

Discography 
1985: Friends of The Farm (Self published cassette)
1986: Hold Your Tongue
1988: Group Therapy
1989: Buzz

References

External links
 
 Alter Natives at Bandcamp
 
 

American jazz ensembles
Music of Richmond, Virginia
Musical groups established in 1984
Musical groups disestablished in 1991
SST Records artists